Cold Seeds is a musical collaboration between Kenny Anderson (King Creosote), Frances Donnelly (Animal Magic Tricks), and Neil Pennycook and Peter Harvey of Meursault.

The term Cold Seeds refers to the project as a whole, encompassing the name of the group and the title of the album that emerged from the collaboration. The name is derived from Frances Donnelly's lyrics to Leave Me To Lie Alone in the Ground.

The album was recorded in the Autumn of 2009 at the Song, by Toad Records recording facility in Stockbridge, Edinburgh. Anderson, Donnelly and Pennycook all wrote songs for the project, which the group then recorded together – each singer often taking the lead vocal role on a song written by one of the other artists – while Harvey composed, arranged and performed the distinctive cello parts.

A limited edition, hand-printed heavyweight-vinyl version of the album was released in March 2010 at Fence Records' annual "Home Game" festival in Anstruther, Fife. A general release was then announced for June 2010.

Track listing

Personnel

Cold Seeds
Kenny Anderson
Frances Donnelly
Peter Harvey
Neil Pennycook

Artwork
Frances Donnelly

References

External links
Song, by Toad Records

2010 debut albums